Min Saw Oo II was viceroy of Toungoo from 1436 to 1440. He was placed in office by King Binnya Ran I of Hanthawaddy. He died in action on his war elephant while fighting against Ava forces trying to retake Toungoo in 1440.

Early life
Saw Oo was descended from a line of nobility. His grandfather was governor of Mindon, and his father Saw Lu would later become governor of Toungoo (Taungoo), a major vassal state. He had two sisters.

Career
Saw Oo's career began in 1420 when King Minkhaung I of Ava appointed his father governor of Toungoo, and Saw Oo governor of Yanaung, a small town in Central Burma. He left Yanaung in 1426 when his father, now styled as Thinkhaya, refused to submit to the new king of Ava, Mohnyin Thado, and declared himself king. The rebellion was aided by the Hanthawaddy Kingdom. Thinkhaya was emboldened by the chaos at Ava that saw three Ava kings assassinated between August 1425 and May 1426. His petty state included the five irrigated zones of present-day Yamethin and Naypyidaw.

Chronicles do not state Saw Oo's exact role during Thinkhaya's reign. Though he was the only son of Thinkhaya, when Thinkhaya died in 1435/36, it was his brother-in-law Uzana that managed to succeed the Toungoo throne. Saw Oo believed the throne was his, and successfully appealed to his other brother-in-law, King Binnya Ran I of Hanthawaddy to intervene. Less than a year of Uzana's accession, Ran came up with his army, and installed Saw Oo.

Saw Oo's reign as vassal king lasted over three years. In 1440, Toungoo came under attack by Ava forces made up of regiments from Taungdwin and Yanaung. The attack was ordered by King Minye Kyawswa I of Ava, who was determined to regain the breakaway region. Saw Oo tried to break the siege by personally leading the Toungoo forces on his war elephant. In the ensuing pitched battle, he was killed by the Ava Commander Yazathingyan of Taungdwin.

One of the Ava commanders, Tarabya, was appointed viceroy of Toungoo.

References

Bibliography
 
 
 

Ava dynasty
Hanthawaddy dynasty
1440 deaths
Year of birth unknown